Antony was the metropolitan bishop of Larissa in 1340–62. In 1359–62, he also served as katholikos krites ton Rhomaion. He was the author of several homilies.

References

Sources
 

14th-century Byzantine people
14th-century Eastern Orthodox bishops
Year of birth unknown
Year of death unknown
Byzantine jurists
Bishops of Larissa
14th-century jurists